This is a list of media in Kamloops, British Columbia.

Radio

Television
The incumbent cable television provider is Shaw Communications.

Kamloops is not designated as a mandatory market for digital television conversion. The Kamloops area does not receive CBC Television, Ici Radio-Canada Télé, or CTV over the air.

Print
The city's main daily newspaper was the Kamloops Daily News which ceased publication in 2014.
The city is also home to Kamloops This Week, a free newspaper which publishes two times a week.

Digital
The city has three websites covering daily news in the Kamloops market: KamloopsMatters, infoNEWS, and KamloopsBCNow. In 2022 a digital media outlet called The Wren launched.

References

Kamloops
 
Media, Kamloops